Halvor Persson (born 11 March 1966) is a Norwegian former ski jumper.

References

External links

1966 births
Living people
Sportspeople from Bærum
Norwegian male ski jumpers
Norwegian people of Swedish descent